Mapledurham Lock is a lock and weir situated on the River Thames in England, about 4 miles upstream of Reading. The lock was first built in 1777 by the Thames Navigation Commissioners and the present lock dates from 1908.

Despite its name, the lock is located in the Berkshire village and civil parish of Purley-On-Thames on the south bank of the river, rather than in the Oxfordshire village of Mapledurham on the other side of the river. The lock is accessible from Purley village down Mapledurham Drive, a metalled lane that turns to gravel. The weir stretches across the river, in both counties.

The weir runs from the lock island in a long curve across the river between the two villages. However no access is possible across the weir, and without a boat, journeys between the two villages require a lengthy detour via Reading or Pangbourne. The weir still provides a head of water to drive Mapledurham Watermill which is on the opposite side of the river.  The weir is also the furthest upstream on the Thames that has a salmon ladder.

History
Mapledurham mill dates back to Domesday Book, and the weir was probably connected to it then, although the earliest extant reference to the weir is from the time of Edward I. The mill was attached to the property of Mapledurham House, owned by the Blount family, who have always had an interest in the weir. There was a flash lock at the weir but passage through this was stopped at the opening of the pound lock in 1777. The lock was built of fir on the Purley side of the river and was to be called Purley Lock. However local custom retained the old name. A cottage was ordered for the lock-keeper in 1816. During the 19th century there were disputes between the lock-keeper William Sheppard and the Blount family. However despite Blount's representations to the Conservators, Sheppard remained in post for 54 years, retiring at the age of 79. A new and greatly enlarged lock was built beside the old one in 1908.

Mapledurham Mill is still functioning across the river from the lock, making this the only lock and weir combination on the Thames that supports the two functions that were originally the norm on river navigations. As both mill and navigation are now principally tourist enterprises, this no longer leads to the sort of conflicts between milling and navigation interests that were once common on the river.

Reach above the lock
The river is in open country nearly all the way to Pangbourne and has been described by Robert Gibbings writing in 1939 (Sweet Thames Run Softly) as so crowded with views "they might have dropped from the gold frames of the Royal Academy".

After Mapledurham, Hardwick House is visible on the northern side of the river. Pangbourne Meadows, owned by the National Trust, lie to the south of the river before Whitchurch Bridge. This toll bridge crosses the river between Pangbourne and Whitchurch. Between the bridge and Whitchurch Lock, the River Pang joins the Thames from the south.

The Thames Path follows the southern bank to Whitchurch Bridge, where it crosses the river. (Although this is a toll bridge, pedestrians are no longer charged).

The artist E. H. Shepherd who illustrated The Wind in the Willows made many drawings in this area, and Toad Hall is said to be based on either Mapledurham House or Hardwick House, home of Charles Day Rose, nearby.

Gallery

See also

Locks on the River Thames

References

Bibliography

Locks of Oxfordshire
Locks on the River Thames
Weirs on the River Thames